Agios Nikitas is a village on the island of Lefkada, Greece, part of the municipal unit of Lefkada (city). It is a small beach resort, situated on the northwestern coast, 4 km northwest of Karya and 10 km southwest of Lefkada city. The village has a church.

Population

See also
List of settlements in the Lefkada regional unit

References

External links
Agios Nikitas on GTP Travel Pages (in English and Greek)

Populated places in Lefkada (regional unit)